Rebecca Ann "Becky" Carney (born December 25, 1944) is a Democratic member of the North Carolina House of Representatives representing the 102nd district since 2003. Her district includes constituents in Mecklenburg county. Carney is a homemaker from Charlotte, North Carolina.

In 2002, Carney defeated Libertarian Daniel Elmaleh in the general election. She had previously been elected in 1996 to the Mecklenburg Board of County Commissioners and served three terms, serving as vice chairman several times. Carney had an unsuccessful run for school board in 1995.

During a late night House session on July 2, 2012, Carney mistakenly cast the deciding vote to override Governor Bev Perdue's veto of Senate Bill 820, granting authority to make hydraulic fracturing legal in North Carolina. A longstanding House rule that disallows changing of a vote if the vote changes the outcome of the bill prevented Carney from correcting her electronic vote to reflect her intended position.

Electoral history

2022

2020

2018

2016

2014

2012

2010

2008

2006

2004

2002

References

External links
North Carolina General Assembly - Representative Becky Carney official NC House website
Project Vote Smart - Representative Becky Carney (NC) profile
Follow the Money - Becky Carney
2008 2006 2004 2002 campaign contributions

Living people
1944 births
People from Charlotte, North Carolina
Politicians from Charlotte, North Carolina
21st-century American politicians
21st-century American women politicians
Women state legislators in North Carolina
County commissioners in North Carolina
Democratic Party members of the North Carolina House of Representatives